Sinevia is a genus of moth in the family Gelechiidae. It contains the species Sinevia temulenta, which is found in Japan.

References

Gelechiinae